Miss World 1993, the 43rd edition of the Miss World pageant, was held on 27 November 1993 at the Sun City Entertainment Centre in Sun City, South Africa. 
It was the second time that the Miss World pageant was held in the South Africa.The pageant attracted 81 contestants from all over the world. This is the second consecutive staging of the pageant in Sun City. The winner was Lisa Hanna of Jamaica. She was crowned by Miss World 1992, Julia Kourotchkina of Russia.

Results

Placements

Contestants

Judges

Eric Morley † 
Frederick Forsyth
Grace Jones
Vanessa Williams
Louis Gossett Jr.
Christie Brinkley
Jackie Chan
 John Ratcliffe
 Dali Tambo
 Juliet Prowse † 
 Twiggy

Notes

Debuts

Returns

Last competed in 1982:
 
Last competed in 1991:

Withdrawals

  – Wang Yin Tao. She went to Miss World 1994 inserted.
  - Split into Czech Republic and Slovakia on 1 January 1993.
  - Lost their Miss World franchise.
  – Zsanna Pardy - Due lack of sponsor. 
  – Mónika Sáez Grimm - Due lack of sponsor. 
  – Adriana Silagy - Due lack of sponsor.
  – Irina Barabash (Chernomaz) - Actually she was a married woman. She later competed at Miss Universe 1995.
  – No contest.

Replacements
  – Anna Baychik - Unable to compete internationally due underage.

Other Notes
  - Véronique de la Cruz  went unplaced at Miss Universe but was a semi-finalist at 1993 in the pageant in Mexico City in just 6 months earlier.

References

Miss World
1993 in South Africa
1993 beauty pageants
Beauty pageants in South Africa
November 1993 events in Africa